Vinil Virtual is the tenth studio album by the Brazilian singer-songwriter Daniela Mercury. It was released on November 27, 2015, by the label Biscoito Fino.

Development
Vinil Virtual was produced by Mercury and Yacoce Simões. All the fifteen tracks were written by her, ten of these tracks were written by herself. Two songs were written with Marcelo Quintanilha, two with here son Gabriel Póvoas and one with Simões. "The songwriters who send me some songs did not translate what I wanted to say at that moment".

Songs and lyrics
Mercury turned two poems written to her wife into songs: "Maria Casaria" and "Sem Argumento". "América do Amor" talks about the Latin American brotherhood, as "Antropofágicos São Paulistanos" celebrates the mix of cultures of the city of São Paulo, "O Riso de Deus" talks with the funk of Rio's proms, as praises the city of Rio de Janeiro. "Senhora do Terreiro (Mãe Carmem)" is about the iyalorixá (priestess) Carmem Oliveira da Silva, daughter and successor of the iyalorixá known as Mãe Menininha do Gantois. "De Deus, de Alah, de Gilberto Gil" is a tribute to the Brazilian singer, songwriter and musician Gilberto Gil, which makes a participation on the track. "Alegria e Lamento" it's a mix of Márcio Victor's percussion with takes of an old record of the already dead Neguinho do Samba, one of the founders of the Olodum. Mercury wrote a song in English with her son Gabriel Póvoas, called "Frogs in the Sky".

Artwork
The cover artwork for Vinil Virtual was revealed for the Rolling Stone Brasil magazine on November 16, 2015. It shows Mercury lying, naked, next to her wife Malu Verçosa, been inspired by the musician couple John Lennon and Yoko Ono, that were on the cover of the No. 335 edition of the American Rolling Stone magazine in January 1981. Mercury said:

Track listing

References

2015 albums
Daniela Mercury albums